The Flower Hill Cemetery, also known as the Burtis Cemetery and Old Cemetery at Flower Hill, is a small, historic cemetery located within the Incorporated Village of Flower Hill, in the Town of North Hempstead, in Nassau County, on the North Shore of Long Island, in New York, United States.

Description 
This cemetery, which dates back to the American Revolution-era, was active between 1798 and 1896. It is one of the oldest places within Flower Hill. Many prominent locals from this time period are buried at this cemetery, including members of the Burtis family, which owned a farm located partially over what is now the North Hempstead Country Club. It is owned by the Incorporated Village of Flower Hill.

In 2010, a local resident, James Morgan McLaughlin, arranged a cleanup effort of the cemetery, as part of his Eagle Scout project.

Notable interments 
The Flower Hill Cemetery has a total of 8 headstones and 10 known interments.

Some notable interments include:
 Burtis, John
 Burtis, Leonard
 Burtis, Martha
 Ireland, Daniel
 Ireland, Elizabeth Sands
 Ireland, Martha
 Johnson, Susannah
 Spencer, Martha

References 

Flower Hill, New York
Cemeteries in Nassau County, New York